Bollywood Film Festival is a film festival held annually in Prague, Czech Republic. It was first launched in 2004 and its mission is to present India's Bollywood films to a Czech audience. The song/dance and dramatic storylines which are typical of many Indian films are finding popularity in European culture.

External links
Official site of the festival
Interview with festival founder, Sangita Shresthova, Radio Prague, 2004
Interview with festival founder, Sangita Shresthova, in Cosmopolitan magazine (Czech edition)
Post by Sangita Shresthova about the festival on Intentblog, the personal weblog of Shekhar Kapur
Sangita Shresthova's website

Film festivals in Prague
Hindi cinema
Recurring events established in 2004